Ssukcha, also called mugwort tea or wormwood tea, is a traditional Korean tea made from Korean mugwort (called ssuk in Korean). It is commonly consumed in both North and South Korea.

Preparation 

The preparation involves leaves of mugwort harvested around the dano month (day 5 of the 5th lunar). This usually takes place around May and June in the Gregorian calendar). The leaves are washed, drained, chopped, and dried in a shaded area for 3‒10 days. Dried mugwort leaves are then roasted in a round-bottomed deokkeum-sot (cauldron for roasting tea). In a teapot, a handful of mugwort and a cup of water is added, and boiled for 5‒10 minutes.

Medicinal use 
Korean mugwort is rich in vitamin A, vitamin C, and minerals. In the past, mugwort tea was believed to help prevent and treat the common cold, reducing fever and inflammation, relieving pain, and lowering blood pressure.

Other uses 
Ssukcha may serve as a natural herbicide.

References 

Herbal tea
Korean tea